Yu Hiu Tung (born 5 February 1984) is a professional tennis player from Hong Kong.  The left-hander stands 1.72m and weighs 140 pounds.  Yu is a member of the Hong Kong Davis Cup team, compiling an 8-12 record in Davis Cup action since 2002.

Yu started playing tennis at age six. He quickly emerged as one of Hong Kong's most highly touted junior players. Highlights of his junior career include ascending to a #70 junior world ranking.

Yu reached his career-high ATP ranking of #910 in the world on 13 June 2005.  At the 2006 Asian Games, Yu won his first round singles match against Bhutan's Deepesh Chhetri, but lost in the second round to Taiwanese Wang Yeu-tzuoo.  In doubles, he and Wong Wing Luen lost to former World No.1s and eventual gold medalists Mahesh Bhupathi and Leander Paes.

In 2007, Yu gave up his professional tennis career, and began study towards an associate degree at HKU Space. He continues to play Davis Cup. On 2 May 2008, he was the 29th person to carry the olympic torch in the 2008 Olympics torch relay leg in Hong Kong.

ATP Challenger and ITF Futures finals

Doubles: 2 (1–1)

References 
 
 
 

1984 births
Living people
Hong Kong male tennis players
Tennis players at the 2002 Asian Games
Tennis players at the 2006 Asian Games
Tennis players at the 2010 Asian Games
Asian Games competitors for Hong Kong